Edward Robinson Squibb (July 4, 1819October 25, 1900) was a medical doctor, a leading American inventor, and manufacturer of pharmaceutics who founded E. R. Squibb and Sons, which eventually became part of the modern pharmaceutical giant Bristol-Myers Squibb.

Early life
Squibb was born in Wilmington, Delaware, on July 4, 1819. He was the son of James Robinson Squibb (1796–1852) and Catherine Harrison (née Bonsal) Squibb (1798–1833), both Quakers.  At age 26 he graduated from Jefferson Medical College in Philadelphia, Pennsylvania.

Career
Immediately after graduating from medical school, he became a ship's doctor in the U.S. Navy, serving during the ongoing Mexican–American War. After the war, he ran the Brooklyn Naval Hospital's medical station at Brooklyn Navy Yard.

As a Navy physician, Squibb became disenchanted with the poor quality of medicines used on American military vessels and, as a result, in 1854 he invented an improved method of distilling ether, an anesthetic. He gave away his distillation method, rather than patent it for profit.

Squibb Company
In 1858, he left the military and started his own pharmaceutics manufacturing business in Brooklyn. His laboratory burned down three times, and in one of these instances an ether explosion left Squibb badly burned.

In 1892, Squibb created a partnership with his two sons, Dr. Edward H. Squibb and Charles F. Squibb, the firm being known for generations afterwards as E. R. Squibb and Sons.  Squibb was known as a vigorous advocate of quality control and high purity standards within the fledgling pharmaceutical industry of his time, at one point self-publishing an alternative to the U.S. Pharmacopeia (Squibb's Ephemeris of Materia Medica) after failing to convince the American Medical Association to incorporate higher purity standards. Mentions of the Materia Medica, Squibb products, and Edward Squibb's opinion on the utility and best method of preparation for various medicants are found in many medical papers of the late 1800s. Squibb Corporation served as a major supplier of medical goods to the Union Army during the American Civil War, providing portable medical kits containing morphine, surgical anesthetics, and quinine for the treatment of malaria (which was endemic in most of the eastern United States at that time).

Personal life
Squibb was married to Caroline F. Lownds Cook (1833–1905) of Philadelphia. Together, they were the parents of:

 Dr. Edward Hamilton Squibb (1853–1929), who married Jane Graves Sampson (1855–1915)
 Charles Fellows Squibb (1858–1942), who married Margaret Rapelje Dodge (1859–1930)
 Mary King Squibb (1865–1950), who married Dr. John Cummings "J.C." Munro (1858–1910).
 George Hanson Squibb (1867–1869), who died young.

Squibb died on October 25, 1900, at his home, 152 Columbia Heights in Brooklyn, New York, from a ruptured blood vessel.

See also

 Squibb Park Bridge

References

External links
 
 The Zentmayer Grand American Microscope once owned by Dr. E. R. Squibb

1819 births
1900 deaths
People from Wilmington, Delaware
Thomas Jefferson University alumni
19th-century American businesspeople
Bristol Myers Squibb people
Businesspeople in the pharmaceutical industry
American manufacturing businesspeople
19th-century American physicians
19th-century American inventors
United States Navy personnel of the Mexican–American War
Burials at Green-Wood Cemetery